Cape Farewell Archipelago (also Nunap Isua Archipelago) is an island group located at the southern end of Greenland in Kujalleq municipality. The archipelago takes its name from Cape Farewell, a headland of Egger Island (also known as Itilleq).

Geography
The Cape Farewell Archipelago is separated from the mainland's south coast by Prince Christian Sound in the north and by the Torsukattak Fjord in the west. The main islands of the group are characterized as large and mountainous, surrounded by fjord-like passages. There are also several islets and rocks.

Islands
Sammisoq (Christian IV Island) is the largest island of the archipelago. Other significant islands include Egger Island (Itilleq), the southernmost of the group, Nunarsuaq (Nunarssuak), Pamialluk, Annikitsoq, Qunnerit, Ikeq, Walkendorff and Qernertoq (Kasit), as well as the Avallersuaq and Saningassoq islets.

See also
List of islands of Greenland

Bibliography

References

Archipelagoes of Greenland
Kujalleq
Cape Farewell Archipelago